7 Letters is a 2015 Singaporean anthology drama film directed by seven different directors. It comprises seven short stories celebrating Singapore's 50th anniversary. The film was selected as the Singaporean entry for the Best Foreign Language Film at the 88th Academy Awards but it was not nominated.

Cast

"Cinema"
Nadiah M.Din as The Actress 
David Chua as Fan Fan Law
Aric Hidir Amin as Slim Villager
Faizal Abdullah as Round Villager 
Hamidah Jalil as Older Actress 
Lim Poh Huat as Pontianak
Juliette Binoche as Lady at Cavenagh Bridge (special appearance)

"That Girl"
Yan Li Xuan as Caiyun 
Josmen Lum as Ah Shun
Brien Lee as Ah Fa
Sebastian Ng as Ah Cai

"The Flame"
T. Sasitharan as Father 
Nithiyia Rao as Leela 
N. Vighnesh as Mani 
Fatin Amira as Helper

"Bunga Sayang"
Ray Tan Liang Yu as Little Boy
J. Rosmini as Makcik 
Faith Denning as Teacher

"Pineapple Town"
Lydia Look as Ning 
Nickson Cheng as Kang
Rexy Tong as Michelle (Baby) 
Rianne Lee as Michelle (6 Years Old)
Anne James as Sumathi
Yoo Ah Min as Ah Gek
Karen Lim as Kim Leng
Rachel Tay as Birth Mum

"Parting"
J.A. Halim as Ismail 
Cheryl Tan as Swee Choo
Khalid Omar as Train Conductor
Jonathan Sim as Immigration Officer
Nickson Cheng as Duty Officer
Desmond Tay Thong Nam as Taxi Driver
Angel Yeung as Woman on Bus
Ashmi Roslan as Young Ismail 
Daryl Toh as Flag-day Boy
Vivian Lim as Shop Assistant

"GPS (Grandma Positioning System)"
Zhang Jin Hua as Grandma
Zheng Geping as Son
Hong Huifang as Daughter-in-law
Hazelle Teo as Granddaughter
Rey Phua as Grandson
Mok Tye Par as Grandpa

Reception
Maggie Lee of Variety called the film "uneven but mostly poignant".  Joanne Soh of The New Paper rated it 4/5 stars and wrote that it "truly is a passion project that will strike a chord with the older generation".  John Lui of My Paper rated it 4.5/5 stars and wrote that the film's quality is good enough to call for a reassessment of assumptions about government-funded art.

Time Out Singapore selected it as the best Singaporean film of 2015.

Controversy
In January 2016, the film was flagged by Malaysian censors before it was due to screen at the Titian Budaya Festival. A successful appeal was made by the organiser, CultureLink, against the cuts for the vulgar phrase in Cantonese, "curse your whole family", in Jack Neo’s segment of the omnibus.

See also
 List of submissions to the 88th Academy Awards for Best Foreign Language Film
 List of Singaporean submissions for the Academy Award for Best Foreign Language Film

References

External links
 

2015 films
2015 drama films
2015 multilingual films
2010s Tamil-language films
2010s English-language films
Malay-language films
Hokkien-language films
2010s Mandarin-language films
Singaporean multilingual films
Singaporean anthology films
Films directed by Eric Khoo
Films directed by Jack Neo
Films directed by Boo Junfeng
Films directed by K. Rajagopal